Body of Influence is a 1993 American erotic thriller drama film directed by Gregory Dark and produced by Andrew W. Garroni. The film has music composed by Ashley Irwin. The film stars Nick Cassavetes, Shannon Whirry, Richard Roundtree, Sandahl Bergman, and Anna Karin. A sequel, Body of Influence 2, was released in 1996.

Cast
 Nick Cassavetes as Jonathan Brooks
 Shannon Whirry as Laura / Lana
 Richard Roundtree as Harry Reams
 Sandahl Bergman as Clarissa
 Anna Karin as Beth
 Don Swayze as Biker
 Catherine Parks as Helen
 Diana Barton as Jennifer
 Kelly Andrus as the Reporter

References

External links
 
 

1993 films
1990s erotic thriller films
1990s thriller drama films
American erotic thriller films
American thriller drama films
Films directed by Gregory Dark
1990s English-language films
1993 drama films
1990s American films